Landmesser is a surname. Notable people with the surname include:

August Landmesser (born 1910), German shipyard worker 
Derek Landmesser (born 1975), Canadian former ice hockey player
Ulf Landmesser (born 1970), German specialist for cardiology and internal medicine
Art Landy (1904 – 1977), American animator specialised in animation set decoration